Odea may refer to:

 J. L. Odea (born 1884), Australian tennis player
 O'Dea, a surname of Irish origin
 Plural of Odeum, ancient Greek or Roman buildings built for musical activities

See also
 Odeax, a brand name of demoxytocin
 Odia (disambiguation)